Artur Dubravčić (15 September 1894 – 13 March 1969) was a Croatian-Yugoslavian footballer.

Club career
When Dubravčić was still in high school in Karlovac, he was one of the founders and first players of the ŠK Olimpija Karlovac football club, which was established in 1908. During World War I he moved to Zagreb and joined local side Concordia, where he spent most of his professional career.

International career
Dubravčić made history by being the first captain of Yugoslavia national football team in the team's inaugural match, a 7–0 defeat versus Czechoslovakia on 28 August 1920, at the 1920 Summer Olympics, and he also scored their first ever goal (against Egypt, five days later). He went on to appear and captain the team nine times in Yugoslavia's first 10 matches in the period between 1920 and 1924.

Post-playing career
After retiring from football he worked as a football referee, sports journalist for Sportske novosti and correspondent for Politika, and a football official. He had died suddenly in 1969, just days before he was supposed to be given a life achievement award as part of Football Association of Yugoslavia's 50th anniversary celebration.

References

External links
 
Artur Dubravčić at the Serbia national football team website 

1894 births
1969 deaths
People from Vrbovsko
People from the Kingdom of Croatia-Slavonia
Association football midfielders
Yugoslav footballers
Yugoslavia international footballers
Footballers at the 1920 Summer Olympics
Footballers at the 1924 Summer Olympics
Olympic footballers of Yugoslavia
HŠK Concordia players
Yugoslav First League players